Gulrock is an unincorporated community in Hyde County, North Carolina, United States.

Education
The local school is Mattamuskeet School of Hyde County Schools.

References

Unincorporated communities in Hyde County, North Carolina
Unincorporated communities in North Carolina
Populated coastal places in North Carolina